Shell Ridge is a census-designated place in Contra Costa County, California, United States. The 2010 United States census reported Shell Ridge's population was 959.

Geography

Demographics
At the 2010 census Shell Ridge had a population of 959. The racial makeup of Shell Ridge was 821 (85.6%) White, 5 (0.5%) African American, 2 (0.2%) Native American, 73 (7.6%) Asian, 6 (0.6%) Pacific Islander, 8 (0.8%) from other races, and 44 (4.6%) from two or more races. Hispanic or Latino of any race were 59 people (6.2%).

The census reported that 100% of the population lived in households.

There were 357 households, 128 (35.9%) had children under the age of 18 living in them, 263 (73.7%) were opposite-sex married couples living together, 20 (5.6%) had a female householder with no husband present, 13 (3.6%) had a male householder with no wife present.  There were 7 (2.0%) unmarried opposite-sex partnerships, and 4 (1.1%) same-sex married couples or partnerships. 52 households (14.6%) were one person and 32 (9.0%) had someone living alone who was 65 or older. The average household size was 2.69.  There were 296 families (82.9% of households); the average family size was 2.96.

The age distribution was 229 people (23.9%) under the age of 18, 46 people (4.8%) aged 18 to 24, 157 people (16.4%) aged 25 to 44, 353 people (36.8%) aged 45 to 64, and 174 people (18.1%) who were 65 or older.  The median age was 48.3 years. For every 100 females, there were 106.2 males.  For every 100 females age 18 and over, there were 100.0 males.

There were 370 housing units at an average density of ,of which 357 were occupied, 334 (93.6%) by the owners and 23 (6.4%) by renters.  The homeowner vacancy rate was 0%; the rental vacancy rate was 11.1%.  887 people (92.5% of the population) lived in owner-occupied housing units and 72 people (7.5%) lived in rental housing units.

Education
A portion of Shell Ridge is in the Walnut Creek Elementary School District and the Acalanes Union High School District. Other parts are in the K-12 Mount Diablo Unified School District.

References

Census-designated places in Contra Costa County, California
Census-designated places in California